Henry Schuyler Thibodaux (September 24, 1769 – October 24, 1827) was a planter and politician, who served one month in 1824 as the fourth Governor of Louisiana. At the time that Governor Thomas B. Robertson resigned in 1824 to accept appointment as a federal judge, Thibodaux was President of the State Senate and succeeded him as Acting Governor, until Henry Johnson was elected.

Early life and family
Thibodaux's birth and parents are shrouded in mystery. He is thought to have been born either in Albany, New York, or Philadelphia, Pennsylvania, to Alexis Thibodeaux and Marie Anne Blanchard of Nicolet, Quebec, Acadian refugees who were expelled from their homeland by the British after they defeated the French in the Seven Years' War (known as the French and Indian War in the United States). Thibodaux was orphaned (his family was thought to have been deported from Pennsylvania) and adopted by General Philip Schuyler, an American Revolutionary War hero. Thibodaux spent his childhood in the United States and is believed to have been sent to Scotland in the 1780s for his education.

After returning to the United States, Thibodaux moved to Louisiana in 1794, while it was under nominal control of the Spanish for several more years. He first settled on what was known as the "Acadian coast" of the Mississippi River, in St. James Parish.

Marriage and family
Thibodeaux (spelling changed to Thibodaux) was married twice, first to a Cajun woman, Félicité Bonvillain, who bore him three children before she died a few years later.  Then he married Bridgette Bélanger, with whom he had five children who lived to adulthood. Thibodaux had five sons in total.

Among the sons was Bannon Goforth Thibodeaux, who was elected as a Democratic Member of Congress in the 1840s.  Before entering politics, Bannon practiced the trade of shoemaker. Bannon G. Thibodeaux was later elected by the state legislature as a United States senator.

Political career
The senior Thibodaux moved from St. James Parish to Lafourche Parish when he received a land grant from Spanish Governor Baron de Carondelet. He developed a plantation he named for Ste. Bridget. Thibodaux was later elected Justice of the Peace and to the Territorial Legislature after the United States acquired and organized the Territory of Orleans.

After Louisiana became a state, from 1812 to 1824, Thibodaux served as a State Senator representing Lafourche Parish and was elected as President of the Senate in 1824. When Governor Thomas B. Robertson resigned to accept an appointment as a Federal judge, Thibodaux succeeded him, serving as Acting Governor for a month until Henry Johnson was elected.

Thibodaux was campaigning for the elected seat of governor in 1827 when he died on October 24, while touring near Bayou Terrebonne.  Thibodaux was interred at Halfway Cemetery in Houma, Louisiana.

Legacy and honors
The city of Thibodaux, Louisiana, was named for him. 
His son Bannon Goforth Thibodeaux was elected as a US Representative and US Senator.

References

External links 
Biography, State of Louisiana  
Cemetery Memorial by La-Cemeteries

1769 births
1827 deaths
People from Thibodaux, Louisiana
Governors of Louisiana
American people of French descent
Louisiana Democratic-Republicans
Louisiana National Republicans
National Republican Party state governors of the United States